Brian Wynter (born in Jamaica, 1959) is a Jamaican banker and financial regulator, who is notable for his work with the Financial Services Commission (FSC). In October 2009, it was announced that he would assume the position as Governor of the Bank of Jamaica on 1 December 2009.

As governor, he was chairman of the board of directors of the bank, and served until August 2019. Previously, he was the Deputy Governor of the Bank of Jamaica.

Education 
He graduated from the London School of Economics in 1981 with a BSc (economics) honours degree. He received the graduate diploma in law from The City University London. Wynter is also the holder of a master's degree specialising in international economics from the School of International and Public Affairs, Columbia University (1985).

References

1959 births
Living people
Alumni of the Inns of Court School of Law
Alumni of the London School of Economics
Governors of the Bank of Jamaica
Jamaican businesspeople
School of International and Public Affairs, Columbia University alumni